Marilyn in reference to a musical about Marilyn Monroe may refer to:

 Bombshell, a 2001 Off-off-Broadway musical comedy which featured a drag queen as Marilyn Monroe.
 Bombshell, conceived for the television series Smash, the music debuted in a concert format in 2015.
 Marilyn: An American Fable, a 1983 Broadway musical that ran at the Minskoff Theatre.
 Marilyn: Scenes from the '50s in two acts, an opera from 1980 which premiered at Teatro dell'Opera di Roma in Italy.
 Marilyn! the Musical, a 1983 British musical that ran at the Adelphi Theatre.
 Marilyn! The New Musical, a 2018 musical that ran at the Paris Theater in Las Vegas.

See also
 Marilyn Monroe in popular culture